Lanterns is the third studio album by Ryan Lott under the Son Lux moniker. It was released on October 29, 2013 by Joyful Noise Recordings. It peaked at number 13 on the Billboard Heatseekers Albums chart, as well as number 6 on the Vinyl Albums chart.

Critical reception
At Metacritic, which assigns a weighted average score out of 100 to reviews from mainstream critics, the album received an average score of 75 based on 8 reviews, indicating "generally favorable reviews".

Gregory Heaney of AllMusic gave the album 4 stars out of 5, calling it "an intricately assembled album of delicate harmonies and solidly crafted beats that sits at the intersection of bedroom pop and left-field production." Chris Buckle of The Skinny gave the album 4 stars out of 5, saying: "In sum, Lanterns is the sound of a maverick talent edging ever closer to his full, stimulating potential."

Track listing

Personnel
Credits adapted from liner notes.

 Ryan Lott – performance, recording
 Ieva Berberian – vocals (1, 3)
 Cameron Schenk – vocals (1, 6)
 Aaron Strumpel – vocals (1, 6)
 Shara Worden – vocals (1)
 Chris Thile – mandolin (1)
 Christopher Wray – pedal steel guitar (1), bass guitar (1)
 Jack Bashkow – saxophone (2)
 Steven Temme – saxophone (2, 4)
 Alex Sopp – flute (2, 5), piccolo (2, 5)
 Lily & Madeleine – vocals (2, 8)
 Rob Moose – violin (3, 5, 7)
 Elena Urioste – violin (3)
 Rafiq Bhatia – guitar (4)
 Cat Martino – vocals (5, 6)
 Nadia Sirota – viola (5, 7)
 David Stith – vocals (5, 8)
 Kate Davis – vocals (5)
 Peter Silberman – vocals (5)
 Darren King – drums (5)
 Noam Pikelny – banjo (7)
 Clarice Jensen – cello (7)
 Jonny Rodgers – tuned wine glasses (8)
 Joseph Branciforte – additional engineering
 DJ2 Kyriakides – additional engineering
 David Lai – additional engineering
 Paul Mahern – additional engineering
 Tomek Miernowski – additional engineering
 Eric Tate – additional engineering
 Anthony Ciannamea – artwork
 Ryan Sievert – artwork

Charts

References

External links
 

2013 albums
Son Lux albums
Joyful Noise Recordings albums